This is the results breakdown of the local elections held in the Valencian Community on 26 May 2019. The following tables show detailed results in the autonomous community's most populous municipalities, sorted alphabetically.

Opinion polls

City control
The following table lists party control in the most populous municipalities, including provincial capitals (shown in bold). Gains for a party are displayed with the cell's background shaded in that party's colour.

Municipalities

Alcoy
Population: 58,977

Alicante
Population: 331,577

Benidorm
Population: 67,558

Castellón de la Plana
Population: 170,888

Elche
Population: 230,625

Elda
Population: 52,404

Gandia
Population: 73,829

Orihuela
Population: 76,778

Torrent
Population: 81,245

Torrevieja
Population: 82,599

Valencia

Population: 791,413

See also
2019 Valencian regional election

References

Valencian Community
2019